Fort DeRussy was an American Civil War-era fortification constructed in 1861 on a hilltop along the west bank of Rock Creek within Washington, D.C., as part of the Defenses of Washington.

History
The fort was named for Gustavus A. DeRussy, or his father, René Edward DeRussy.
It was a trapezoidal earthwork with a perimeter of 190 yards, and places for 13 guns. There were also supporting rifle pits, and abatis in the Rock Creek streambed.

The fort provided support during the nearby Battle of Fort Stevens (July 11–12, 1864), contributing a large amount of cannon fire in the course of that battle; the fort's 100-pounder Parrott rifle was particularly effective then, getting off 32 rounds. 
Today, the grounds of the fort are administered by the U.S. National Park Service as part of Rock Creek Park in the northern portion of the District of Columbia.

The fort's parapet and dry moat are in a good state of preservation, remnants of powder magazines are still visible, and lines of infantry trenches that protected the fort are still present near the fort.

The site, heavily wooded, is easily reached by a trail from the west bank of the creek north of Military Road, so-called because it connected the ring of defensive installations around the capital.

External links
 Fort DeRussy Cultural Landscapes Inventory by the University of Pennsylvania Graduate Program in Historic Preservation and the Chesapeake Watershed Cooperative Ecosystem Studies Unit
  Forts around Washington, D.C. during the Civil War

References

DeRussy, Fort
DeRussy
DeRussy
Forts on the National Register of Historic Places in Washington, D.C.
1861 establishments in Washington, D.C.
American Civil War on the National Register of Historic Places
Rock Creek Park
Military installations established in 1861
1865 disestablishments in Washington, D.C.
Military installations closed  in 1865